South Arkansas lies within the southernmost portions of Arkansas Gulf Coastal Plain and Delta regions. It encompasses the lower 15 counties of the state.

History
In the 1920s, nationwide attention focused on South Arkansas when the Smackover Field was ranked first among the nation's oil fields. For five months in 1925, the  Smackover Field was the focal point of one of the wildest mineral booms in North America. Today, south Arkansas's oil fields produce petroleum throughout a 10-county area.

Columbia and Union counties also stretch over one of the largest Brine reserves in the world. Bromine is derived from brine, or saltwater, and local companies play an international role in the commercialization of bromine and its many applications.

Counties
Ashley County
Bradley County
Calhoun County
Chicot County
Cleveland County
Columbia County
Desha County
Drew County
Hempstead County
Lafayette County
Little River County
Miller County
Nevada County
Ouachita County
Union County

Important cities and towns
Arkansas City
Ashdown
Bearden
Camden
East Camden
El Dorado
Hope
Junction City
Kingsland
Lake Village
Louann
Magnolia
Monticello
Prescott
Rison
Smackover
Texarkana (largest city)
Urbana
Waldo

References

Regions of Arkansas